Hypogeusia is a reduced ability to taste things (to taste sweet, sour, bitter, or salty substances). The complete lack of taste is referred to as ageusia.
Causes of hypogeusia include the chemotherapy drug bleomycin, an antitumor antibiotic, Bell's Palsy, and zinc deficiency among others.

References

Gustatory system
Symptoms and signs of mental disorders